McClellan Air Force Base (1935–2001) is a former United States Air Force base located in the North Highlands area of Sacramento County,  northeast of Sacramento, California.

History
For the vast majority of its operational lifetime, McClellan was a logistics and maintenance facility for a wide variety of military aircraft, equipment and supplies. Initially known as the Pacific Air Depot and Sacramento Air Depot, in 1939 the base was renamed for Major Hezekiah McClellan, a pioneer in arctic aeronautical tests. Born in 1894, he died on 25 May 1936 when his Consolidated P-30 which he was flight testing crashed near Centerville, Ohio.

The depot went through several name changes, finishing its life in 1995 as the Sacramento Air Logistics Center (SALC). The SALC reported to the Air Force Logistics Command (AFLC) and later the Air Force Materiel Command (AFMC).

In 1986, the U.S. Air Force established the McClellan Aviation Museum on what was then McClellan Air Force Base. The museum was later chartered by the National Museum of the United States Air Force.

The United States Coast Guard previously operated Coast Guard Air Station Sacramento at McClellan AFB as a tenant activity, operating and maintaining several HC-130 Hercules aircraft.  CGAS Sacramento continues to operate at McClellan following its closure as an Air Force Base and is the only remaining military aviation unit and installation on the airfield.

In 1993, the base was selected by the Pentagon for closure. At first, McClellan was scratched from a list of bases to be closed, but that decision was faced with allegations that the Clinton administration was playing politics. The base was eventually selected for closure, and there were plans to offset the expected loss of $1.5 billion, and 11,000 jobs, to the California economy. The plan relied on privatization and other investment to offset the economic and employment losses. The base is now McClellan Business Park, a growing business enclave that hosts a diverse mix of companies spread across more than 8 million square feet of space of all types. This former military facility is now home to hundreds of private companies, as well as state, federal and local government agencies.

The Air Force Reserve's 604th Regional Support Group, part of Fourth Air Force, was planned to move to March Air Reserve Base, CA., in July 1997, as a result of various Base Closure and Realignment Commission (BRAC) changes. 

In 2005, the McClellan Aviation Museum changed its name to the Aerospace Museum of California. Various military aircraft sit on display inside one of the hangars, and many more are outside on the flightline. The museum has displays which highlight the mission of the base when it was active, as well as neighboring bases such as Beale AFB, Travis AFB and the since closed Mather AFB. The museum hosts educational programs to schools in the local area.

In 2015, the Sacramento Bee reported that McClellan Airfield had been designated as a Superfund site, because the Environmental Protection Agency has identified  326 waste areas on the base. Water wells closest to the base in the Rio Linda-Elverta district, have had the highest levels of hexavalent chromium, which is a known carcinogen. Water from six of 11 wells tested above the state’s maximum contaminant levels for chromium-6, which is 10 parts per billion.

Names
 Pacific Air Depot, 1935 -  1 February 1937
 Sacramento Air Depot 1 February 1937 - 1 December 1939
 McClellan Field, 1 December 1939 - 13 January 1948
 McClellan Air Force Base (dates to be confirmed, closed 2001)
 McClellan Business Park, 2009–present

Major command assignments 
 Material Division, United States Army Air Corps, 24 August 1938 - 11 December 1941
 Air Service Command, 11 December 1941 - 17 July 1944
 Army Air Forces Materiel and Services Command, 17 July 1944 - 31 August 1944
 Army Air Forces Technical Service Command, 31 August 1944 - 1 July 1945
 Air Technical Service Command, 1 July 1945 - 9 March 1946
 Air Materiel Command, 9 March 1946 - 1 April 1961
 Air Force Logistics Command, 1 April 1961 - 1 July 1992
 Air Force Materiel Command, 1 July 1992 - 13 July 2001

Environmental contamination
The McClellan Restoration Advisory Board provides a forum for the local community, regulatory agencies, and Air Force to share information on current and future environmental cleanup programs and reuse at the former base.

See also

 California World War II Army Airfields
 Western Air Defense Force (Air Defense Command)
 8th Air Division
 Doolittle Raid
 McClellan AFB Annex

References

External links
California Military History Museum, 
Aerospace Museum of California website
Oroville Mercury Register re: Aero Union move to McClellan
McClellan Business Park

Installations of the United States Air Force in California
History of Sacramento, California
Landmarks in Sacramento, California
Initial United States Air Force installations
History of Sacramento County, California
Military Superfund sites
Buildings and structures in Sacramento County, California
Superfund sites in California
Military installations closed in 2001
Business parks of the United States